Ras al-'Ayn is a village in southern Syria, administratively part of the Rif Dimashq Governorate, located southwest of Damascus. Nearby localities include Yabroud to the northeast, Ras al-Maara to the northwest, and Ma'loula to the southwest. According to the Syria Central Bureau of Statistics, the village had a population of 2,754 in the 2004 census. Its inhabitants are predominantly Sunni Muslims.

References

Bibliography

Populated places in Yabroud District